The Sturgeon House is a saltbox house dating from around 1838 in Fairview, Erie County, in the U.S. state of Pennsylvania. It was listed on the National Register of Historic Places in 1980. The Sturgeon House is operated as museum by the Fairview Area Historical Society.

Design 
The Sturgeon House is located at the intersection of Water Street and Avonia Road (Pennsylvania Route 98). The house is a rare example of a saltbox house in northwestern Pennsylvania, as well as a house with a recessed side porch. The house is constructed of "stone foundation walls and topped with heavy timber sills which are notched to receive log form beams." The roof of the house is slanted at an angle of 30 degrees. The front door is framed by a cornice and Federal-style entablature and pilaster.

History 

Jeremiah and William Sturgeon were the earliest settlers of what is now Fairview Township, who acquired land from the Pennsylvania Population Company in 1797. The Sturgeons operated "coach stops and taverns" in the area for travelers after the first road was cut from Erie to Cleveland, Ohio in 1805. They founded the community of Sturgeonville, which eventually became Fairview. The house was built around 1838 by Samuel C. Sturgeon and is one of several built by the Sturgeons. The southern addition of the house was possibly constructed in the early 1850s. The Sturgeon House was sold to the Fairview Area Historical Society in 1979 by a descendant of the Jeremiah Sturgeon. The house was listed on the National Register of Historic Places on December 10, 1980.

See also 

 List of museums in Pennsylvania
 National Register of Historic Places listings in Erie County, Pennsylvania

References

Sources

External links 
 Sturgeon House, Fairview Area Historical Society

Houses completed in 1838
Federal architecture in Pennsylvania
Historic house museums in Pennsylvania
Houses in Erie County, Pennsylvania
Houses on the National Register of Historic Places in Pennsylvania
Museums in Erie County, Pennsylvania
Saltbox architecture in the United States
National Register of Historic Places in Erie County, Pennsylvania